They Fought for Their Country is a 1975 Soviet war film in two parts based on the eponymous novel written by Mikhail Sholokhov and directed by Sergei Bondarchuk. It was entered into the 1975 Cannes Film Festival. The film is the story of a Soviet platoon fighting a rearguard action during the German drive on Stalingrad. The film was selected as the Soviet entry for the Best Foreign Language Film at the 49th Academy Awards, but was not accepted as a nominee.

Plot
July 1942. After having lost a large number of soldiers in battle, a Soviet rifle regiment retreats to Stalingrad. During a pause, the soldiers talk about various topics, then bathe and sleep. One of the soldiers of the regiment, Pyotr Lopakhin (Vasily Shukshin), who gives the impression of a merry fellow and a joker, goes to a nearby village for salt and a bucket to cook freshly caught crayfish in. Relying on his talkative charm, Lopakhin makes a request to an old Cossack woman (Angelina Stepanova) but is met with contempt as the soldiers retreat leaving the locals to fend for themselves. After a difficult conversation, it turns out that behind the mask of a merry fellow Lopakhin, there emerges a serious person who is deeply worried about the fate of his country, and the old woman fulfills his request.

Interrupting the cooking of their crayfish, an order arrives directing them to occupy and hold the high ground in the middle of the steppe. Digging in through rocky ground, the regiment's men set up positions and manage to repel the first tank attack with grenades and anti-tank rifles. Before the second wave, German aircraft bomb the positions of the regiment resulting in many casualties and Private Nikolai Streltsov (Vyacheslav Tikhonov), Lopakhin's friend, suffers heavy shell shock. The second German tank attack is almost successful, but arriving Soviet reinforcements push the enemy back.
The regiment marches that night through a burning wheat field. Private Ivan Zvyagintsev (Sergey Bondarchuk), a former combine operator, is horrified by the great loss of food caused by the war.

Having reached the next farm, while the fighters are preparing for battle, Lopakhin flirts with a local woman, managing to obtain two jugs of cold milk for his comrades. In the next battle, using a PTRD, he shoots down a German Junkers Ju 87 attack aircraft, which crashes and explodes into a hill.

Later, after some time in another place, the regiment again engages in battle with enemy tanks. The tanks crush the positions of the defenders: the young corporal Kochetygov dies a heroic death, having managed to set fire to the tank with the help of a Molotov cocktail with his last breath. The remaining Soviet soldiers launch a counterattack, during which Private Zvyagintsev is severely wounded by artillery shrapnel. The Germans are forced into retreat, and a young, fragile nurse (Tatiana Bozhok) pulls the large ("before the war - 93 kilograms") Zvyagintsev from the battlefield. After having buried the last officer in the regiment (lieutenant; Nikolai Gubenko), the regiment moves on again. During their break, Private Nekrasov (Yuri Nikulin), the father of four children, amuses the soldiers with a funny story about how he accidentally scared a decrepit old woman who thought that he was trying to pester her at night. In the field hospital, Zvyagintsev is operated on without anesthesia as the surgeon extracts numerous fragments from his legs and back.

The regiment is then located in just the next village, but there is no food in the military stores, and the locals refuse to feed the retreating soldiers. Lopakhin makes an attempt to charm an unapproachable villager — Natalya (Nonna Mordyukova) — and helps her with her farm work. At night, Lopakhin wants to seduce the woman, but she hits him in the eye in the dark. The next morning, with a black eye, Lopakhin finds a table full of food and concludes that his plan was still a success. Natalya bitterly answers him that she has a husband who is now in the hospital and that she only prepared the food for them because the foreman of the regiment had told the local chairman that they had recently prevailed in a very difficult battle against the enemy. Natalya adds that the locals were ready to give them everything if only the soldiers would protect them.

Lopakhin notices Nikolai Streltsov in the crowd. It turns out that he has escaped from the field hospital, and, despite being completely deaf and shell-shocked, has joined his comrades. Recently arrived colonel (Evgeny Samoilov) heartily thanks the fighters and kisses the banner of the regiment, which has been diligently guarded throughout the film. Large forces of Soviet troops continue moving toward Stalingrad.

Cast
 Vasily Shukshin as Piotr Lopakhin
 Vyacheslav Tikhonov as private Nikolay Strel'tsov
 Sergei Bondarchuk as private Ivan Zvyagintsev
 Georgi Burkov as private Alexandr Kopytovskij
 Yuri Nikulin as private Nekrasov
 Ivan Lapikov as starshina Poprischenko
 Nikolai Gubenko as Lieutenant Goloshchekov
 Andrei Rostotsky as gefreiter Kochetygov
 Nikolai Volkov as private Nikiforov
 Nikolai Shutko as cook Lisichenko
 Yevgeni Samojlov as Colonel Marchenko
 Nonna Mordyukova as Natalya Stepanovna
 Lidiya Fedoseyeva-Shukshina as Glasha
 Innokenti Smoktunovsky as Doctor

See also
 List of submissions to the 49th Academy Awards for Best Foreign Language Film
 List of Soviet submissions for the Academy Award for Best Foreign Language Film

References

External links

 

1975 films
1975 drama films
1970s war drama films
Soviet war drama films
Russian war drama films
Eastern Front of World War II films
Films about the Battle of Stalingrad
Films directed by Sergei Bondarchuk
Films set in 1942
Films set in Russia
Films set in the Soviet Union
Films shot in Russia
1970s Russian-language films
Russian World War II films
Soviet World War II films